Juan José de Jesús Yas (1846 - 1917), born Kohei Yasu, was a Japanese-born photographer who established himself in Antigua Guatemala, Guatemala and documented the city toward the end of the 19th century and early 20th century.

Biography

Yas arrived to Guatemala as translator of the famous Mexican astronomer Covarrubias and he liked photography so much, that he became a student of German professor Herbruger.

Death

Died in Antigua Guatemala in 1917.

See also

 Alberto G. Valdeavellano
 Antigua Guatemala

Notes and references

References

External links
 

1846 births
1917 deaths
Guatemalan photographers
20th-century Guatemalan historians
Guatemalan male writers
People from Sacatepéquez Department
People from Iwate Prefecture
Japanese emigrants to Guatemala
19th-century Guatemalan historians